Ahmed Al-Shaqran (born October 2, 1987) is a Jordanian footballer who plays as a striker for Al-Yarmouk and the Jordan national football team.

International career
Al-Shaqran's first international match with the Jordan national senior team was against Kuwait on October 13, 2014 when they draw 1-1.

References

External links 
 uk.eurosport.yahoo.com 
 asia.eurosport.com 
 

Living people
Jordan international footballers
Expatriate footballers in Bahrain
Ittihad Al-Ramtha players
Kufrsoum SC players
Bahrain SC players
Al-Jazeera (Jordan) players
Al-Yarmouk FC (Jordan) players
1987 births
Jordanian footballers
Jordanian expatriate footballers
Jordanian expatriate sportspeople in Bahrain
Mansheyat Bani Hasan players
Al-Hussein SC (Irbid) players
Al-Ramtha SC players
Association football forwards